Since We Met is a live album by jazz pianist Bill Evans with Eddie Gómez and Marty Morell, recorded at the Village Vanguard in New York City in 1974 and released on the Fantasy label in 1976. Additional recordings from Evans' 1974 Village Vanguard performances were also issued on the album Re: Person I Knew, released posthumously in 1981. The album was digitally remastered and reissued as a CD in 1991 on Original Jazz Classics.

Reception
The Allmusic review by Scott Yanow awarded the album 4 stars and called it "a good example of Bill Evans' early-'70s trio as it typically sounded in clubs".

Track listing
All compositions by Bill Evans except as indicated
 "Since We Met" - 8:52
 "Midnight Mood" (Joe Zawinul) - 6:53
 "See-Saw" (Cy Coleman) - 6:53
 "Sareen Jurer" (Earl Zindars) - 6:39
 "Time Remembered" - 5:27
 "Turn Out the Stars" - 5:07
 "But Beautiful" (Johnny Burke, Jimmy Van Heusen) - 6:21
Recorded at the Village Vanguard, New York City on January 11 & 12, 1974.

Personnel
Bill Evans - piano
Eddie Gómez - bass
Marty Morell - drums
Recorded and remixed by Michael De Lugg
Mastered by David Turner
Remastering (1991) - Phil De Lancie
Liner notes - Max Gordon
Cover painting - Ron Warwell

References

Bill Evans live albums
1974 live albums
Fantasy Records live albums
Albums produced by Helen Keane (record producer)
Albums produced by Orrin Keepnews
Albums recorded at the Village Vanguard